"Preach" is the first single and 9th track by Canadian rapper Drake from his commercial mixtape  If You're Reading This It's Too Late. The song was published and distributed by Universal Music Group.

Composition

"Preach" contains a sample from the 2014 Ekali song Unfaith. Unfaith was also sampled on Wednesday Night Interlude, the 10th track on IYRTITL. Preach also included a sample from "Stay" performed by Henry Krinkle. The song features production and a guest verse from PARTYNEXTDOOR.

Commercial performance
In Canada, "Preach" peaked at number 66 on Billboard Canadian Hot 100. In the United States, it reached number 82 on Billboard Hot 100 and number 27 on Billboard Hot R&B/Hip Hop Songs. "Preach" also peaked at number 53 on UK Singles Chart.

Charts

References

2015 singles
2015 songs
Cash Money Records singles
Drake (musician) songs
PartyNextDoor songs
Song recordings produced by PartyNextDoor
Songs written by Alicia Keys
Songs written by Drake (musician)
Songs written by 40 (record producer)
Songs written by PartyNextDoor
Songs written by Kerry Brothers Jr.